Bochum-Ehrenfeld station is a station in the district of Ehrenfeld of the city of Bochum in the German state of North Rhine-Westphalia. It is on the Witten/Dortmund–Oberhausen/Duisburg railway and it is classified by Deutsche Bahn as a category 5 station. The station was opened on 25 September 1977.

The station is served by line S 1 of the Rhine-Ruhr S-Bahn (Dortmund–Solingen) on week days every 15 minutes during the day between Dortmund and Essen.

References

Rhine-Ruhr S-Bahn stations
S1 (Rhine-Ruhr S-Bahn)
Railway stations in Germany opened in 1977
1977 establishments in West Germany
Ehrenfeld